Sung Hee-Jun (born 8 June 1974) is a retired South Korea long jumper.

He finished sixteenth at the 1995 Summer Universiade and fourth at the 1998 Asian Games. He also competed at the 1992 World Junior Championships, the 1996 Olympic Games, the 1997 World Championships, the 1999 World Championships and the 2000 Olympic Games without reaching the final.

His personal best time was 8.01 metres, achieved in June 1998 in Chungju.

References

1974 births
Living people
South Korean male long jumpers
Athletes (track and field) at the 1996 Summer Olympics
Athletes (track and field) at the 2000 Summer Olympics
Olympic athletes of South Korea
Athletes (track and field) at the 1994 Asian Games
Athletes (track and field) at the 1998 Asian Games
Asian Games competitors for South Korea